Nirsevimab, sold under the brand name Beyfortus, is a human recombinant monoclonal antibody with activity against respiratory syncytial virus, or RSV for infants. It is under development by AstraZeneca and Sanofi. Nirsevimab is designed to bind to the fusion protein on the surface of the RSV virus.

The most common side effects reported for nirsevimab are rash, pyrexia (fever) and injection site reactions (such as redness, swelling and pain where the injection is given).

Nirsevimab was approved for medical use in the European Union in November 2022.

Adverse effects 
No major hypersensitivity reactions have been reported, and adverse events of grade 3 or higher were only reported in 8% (77 of 968) of participants in clinical trial NCT02878330.

Pharmacology

Mechanism of action 
Nirsevimab binds to the prefusion conformation of the RSV fusion protein, i.e. it binds to the site at which the virus would attach to a cell; effectively rendering it useless. It has a modified Fc region, extending the half-life of the drug in order for it to last the whole RSV season.

History 
The opinion by the Committee for Medicinal Products for Human Use (CHMP) of the European Medicines Agency (EMA) is based on data from two randomized, double-blind, placebo-controlled multicenter clinical trials that investigated the efficacy and safety of nirsevimab in healthy preterm (premature) and full-term infants entering their first respiratory syncytial virus (RSV) season. These studies demonstrated that nirsevimab prevents lower respiratory tract infection caused by RSV requiring medical attention (such as bronchiolitis and pneumonia) in term and preterm infants during their first RSV season.

The safety of nirsevimab was also evaluated in a phase II/III, randomized, double‑blind, multicenter trial in infants who were born five or more weeks prematurely (less than 35 weeks gestation) at higher risk for severe RSV disease and infants with chronic lung disease of prematurity (i.e. long-term respiratory problems faced by babies born prematurely) or congenital heart disease. The results of this study showed that nirsevimab had a similar safety profile compared to palivizumab (Synagis).

Society and culture

Legal status 
On 15 September 2022, the Committee for Medicinal Products for Human Use (CHMP) of the European Medicines Agency (EMA) adopted a positive opinion, recommending the granting of a marketing authorization for the medicinal product Beyfortus, intended for the prevention of respiratory syncytial virus (RSV) lower respiratory tract disease in newborns and infants. Beyfortus was reviewed under EMA's accelerated assessment program. The applicant for this medicinal product is AstraZeneca AB. Nirsevimab was approved for medical use in the European Union in November 2022.

Research 
Nirsevimab is being investigated as an experimental vaccine against respiratory syncytial virus, RSV, in the general infant population. The MELODY study is an ongoing, randomized, double-blind, placebo-controlled to evaluate the safety and efficacy of nirsevimab in late preterm and term infants. Initial results have been promising, with nirsevimab reducing LRTI (lower respiratory tract infections) by 74.5% compared to placebo in infants born at term or late preterm.

Ongoing trials for nirsevimab are:

References 

Antiviral drugs
Vaccines
Monoclonal antibodies